The 2016–17 Latvian Football Cup is the 22nd season of the Latvian annual football knock-out competition. The winners will qualify for the first qualifying round of the 2017–18 UEFA Europa League.

Participating clubs 
The following teams will take part in the competition:

First round 
The first round consists of 8 matches, between 16 of the qualifying teams from the Latvian Second League. 9 teams from the Second League automatically qualified for the second round, based on a lottery. The matches of this round took place on 4–15 June 2016.

|-
!colspan="3" align="center"|4 June

|-
!colspan="3" align="center"|5 June

|-
!colspan="3" align="center"|10 June

|-
!colspan="3" align="center"|11 June

|-
!colspan="3" align="center"|15 June

|}

Second round 
The 8 winners of the first round joined the 9 Second League teams that automatically qualified, in addition to 14 teams from the First League. These 32 teams played 15 head-to-head matches to determine who will move on to the third round. The matches of this round took place on 26 June–7 July 2016. FK Lielupe received a bye.

|-
!colspan="3" align="center"|26 June

|-
!colspan="3" align="center"|2 July

|-
!colspan="3" align="center"|3 July

|-
!colspan="3" align="center"|4 July

|-
!colspan="3" align="center"|6 July

|-
!colspan="3" align="center"|7 July

|}

Third round 

|-
!colspan="3" align="center"|9 July

|-
!colspan="3" align="center"|10 July

|}

Fourth round 
Teams from the Latvian Higher League enter at this stage.

|-
!colspan="3" align="center"|16 July

|-
!colspan="3" align="center"|17 July

|-
!colspan="3" align="center"|18 July

|-
!colspan="3" align="center"|25 September

|}

Quarter-finals 

|-
!colspan="3" align="center"|8 April

|-
!colspan="3" align="center"|9 April

|}

Semi final
Played on 26 April 2017 and 3 May 2017; over two legs.

Final 
The final was played on 17 May 2017
Skonto Stadions, Riga
Referee : Andris Treimanis 

|}

References

External links 
 LFF.lv

Latvian Football Cup seasons
Latvian Football Cup
Cup
Cup